"Greased Lightnin'" is a song from the 1971 musical Grease which was also adapted into the 1978 film Grease. A soundtrack recording from the film version, with John Travolta on lead vocals, peaked at No. 47 on the Billboard Hot 100 in 1978.

Synopsis
Kenickie, a member of the greaser gang at the center of the musical, has purchased a used car with the savings from his summer job, giving it the nickname "Greased Lightnin'." While the other greasers are skeptical of the car because it is in such poor shape, he is able to win them over with a rousing rock and roll number describing the modifications needed to transform it into a hot rod capable of arousing the ladies. The lyrics portray Kenickie (in the film, Danny) as more of a dreamer or even poseur than a real gearhead because some of the features he describes are mutually exclusive with others: a car with an "automatic ... Hydramatic" transmission therefore could not have "a four speed on the floor" i.e. manual transmission, and "four-barrel quads" are carburetors inconsistent with true "Fuel injection cut off". (In the film, despite the contradictions in the lyrics, the greasers along with a shop teacher succeed in rebuilding the car into racing condition.) Both the musical and the film imply that at least some of the parts Kenickie uses are stolen.

In the original recording, as was in the case with the stage musical on which it was based, several unairable profanities of a sexual nature are peppered throughout the lyrics, which deterred a number of stations from playing the song and possibly prevented it from reaching the top 40 in the United States. It was one of the few songs from the original Chicago-centric version of Grease to transition, uncut, from Chicago to Broadway and to film. Jim Jacobs later released a revised set of lyrics suitable for school performances that remove the sexual references (this "clean" version was also used in Fox's live television production of Grease), and most televised edits of the film cut the offending lyrics.

In the original musical, the song is Kenickie's featured number, with the other greasers serving as his backup singers. The film expands upon the car's purpose. Whereas the stage musical gives no particular reason for Kenickie's desire to build the car (which does not play a major factor in the play beyond that point), the film explains that the greasers' rivals, named the Scorpions in the film, had challenged them to a quarter-mile drag race, requiring them to have a competitive car for the duel. With Danny at the helm (and a reprise of "Greased Lightnin'" playing in the background), Greased Lightnin' wins the race. The film is also notable for having Danny (played by John Travolta, who had already had top-40 hits before Grease) sing lead on the song, while Kenickie (Jeff Conaway) contributed with a few call-and-response lines.

In keeping with the musical's tendency to use styles of music popular in the late 1950s, the song "Greased Lightnin'" is in a slightly modified twelve-bar blues form, and is inspired by the 1959 single "White Lightning" by the Big Bopper. 

Record World said that "the beat is 50s perfect."

Charts

Weekly charts

Year-end charts

Critical reception
STL Today described the song as "a number saluting a hot rod and all the joy it promises".

Other recordings
In the film version of Grease, the song was recorded by John Travolta.  An earlier version was recorded in 1972 by The Wild Angels. The song was covered by Lance Ellington in the animated film Planet 51. Irish pop band Westlife had a recorded cover of the song in 2003. The song was parodied by David Flora and Dave Stecco of the Blurry Photos podcast as the opening of their Thunderbirds episode, which they admitted was unlicensed.

References

1971 songs
1978 singles
American rock-and-roll songs
John Travolta songs
Songs about cars
Songs from Grease (musical)
Songs from Grease (film)
Songs written by Jim Jacobs
Songs written by Warren Casey